Giovanni Palmieri may refer to:

 Giovanni Palmieri (tennis) (1906-unknown), Italian tennis player
 Giovanni Palmieri (footballer) (born 1989), Brazilian footballer